Las golfas is a 1969 Mexican film directed by Fernando Cortés and starring Isela Vega, Gilda Mirós, Gina Romand, José Luis Rodríguez and Ángel Garasa.

Plot
The stories of sex workers and their struggle to leave their lifestyle behind.

Cast
Isela Vega as Otilia
Gilda Mirós as Rosaura
Gina Romand as Mariana
Malú Reyes as Emma
Sandra Boyd as Elvira
José Luis Rodríguez as Andrés "El Uñas"
Ángel Garasa as Don Florentino Fernández (as Don Angel Garasa)
Sergio Barrios as The Director
Omar Jasso as Crisóforo Belloso, the drunk (as Omar Jaso)
Jorge Ortiz de Pinedo as El Quinto
Rafael Inclán as The Preacher
Enrique Pontón
Clara Osollo
Aurora Alonso as La costeña
Arturo Silva
Clarissa Ahuet (as Clarisa Ahuet)
Polo Villa
Antonio Brillas
Carlos Bravo y Fernández (uncredited)
Roberto Meyer as Don Nachito (uncredited)

References

Bibliography
 Gomezjara, Francisco A.; Barrera, Estanislao; Pérez Ramírez; Nicolás. Sociología de la prostitución. Ediciones Nueva Sociología, 1978.
 García Riera, Emilio. Historia documental del cine mexicano: 1968-1969. Universidad de Guadalajara, 1994.
 Garcia Berumen, Frank Javier. Latino Image Makers in Hollywood: Performers, Filmmakers and Films Since the 1960s. McFarland, 2016.

External links
 

1969 films
1969 drama films
Mexican drama films
Films directed by Fernando Cortés
Films about prostitution in Mexico
1960s Mexican films